Rafael D. Palacios (1905–1993) was a Puerto Rican-American freelance artist and illustrator specializing in book jackets and maps for major U.S. publishers in the mid- and late 20th century. Among the notable maps of his prolific and highly successful career are those in most of Isaac Asimov's history books and in Bruce Catton's Civil War books.

Biography
Of Spanish-Puerto Rican parentage, Palacios was born in Santo Domingo, capital of the Dominican Republic. When he was five months old his family moved to Puerto Rico. He was educated in the Puerto Rican schools, but as an artist was largely self-taught. In 1928 he did his first fine arts sketches while in San Juan. He made something of a specialty of Afro-Caribbean portraiture. He made a brief visit to the United States in 1931. In 1937 he was chosen, with two others, to represent Puerto Rico at the second annual Exhibition of American Art in New York City. In 1938 he also exhibited at the Delphic Studios in New York, where he presented his first display of Afro-Antillean art (a one-man show of his gouaches). That same year he also exhibited at the first Newspaper Artists' Exhibition in New York, and in several one-man shows at the Athenaeum in San Juan and at the University of Puerto Rico.

Beginning in 1938 Palacios worked for American newspapers as an illustrator and translator of comic strips. In the mid-1940s, he shared a studio with several other freelance artists and did a number of covers and endpapers for Bantam Books. His endpapers had a strong cartographic quality and served a similar purpose with Dell Books' mapbacks.

In 1948, Palacios was chosen to produce the maps for Gen. Dwight D. Eisenhower's memoir, Crusade in Europe.

Palacios took over as the cartographer from George Annand for the Rivers of America series in 1956. The last 13 books in the series (1956–74) contain maps by him.

Works illustrated

The Gift Horse (1945) by Frank Gruber (Bantam)
The Fog Comes (1946) and Dead Center (1946) by Mary Collins (Bantam) 
Lydia Bailey (1947) by Kenneth Robert (Doubleday) [endpaper map]
Crusade in Europe (1948) by Dwight D. Eisenhower (Doubleday)
The Well of the Unicorn (1948) by Fletcher Pratt
A Short History of the Civil War: Ordeal by Fire (1948) by Fletcher Pratt (William Sloane) [maps]
The Return of Tarzan (1948 reprint), by E.R. Burroughs (Grosset & Dunlap) [End paper map, board, and title page drawings] 
Canada: Tomorrow's Giant (1957) by Bruce Hutchison (Oxford University Press) [maps]
Constantinople; birth of an empire (1957) by Harold Lamb [2 maps]
The Singing Wilderness (1957) by Sigurd F. Olson
William Diamond's Drum (1959) [reprinted as Lexington and Concord, 1963] by Arthur B. Tourtellot [8 maps]
Around the World in 2,000 Pictures (1959), ed. by A. Milton Runyon and Vilma F. Bergane (Doubleday) [20 maps]
The Long Death: The Last Days of the Plains Indians (1964) by Ralph K. Andrist (21 maps)
The Habsburgs (1966) by Dorothy Gies McGuigan (Doubleday)
Asimov's Guide to the Bible (1967, 1969) by Isaac Asimov 
Stalin and His Generals: Soviet Military Memoirs of World War II (1969) by Seweryn Bailer (Pegasus) [maps]
The Last of the Bush Pilots (1969) by Harmon "Bud" Helmericks [maps]
Asimov's Guide to Shakespeare (1970) by Isaac Asimov
Great Cities of the Ancient World (1972) by L. Sprague de Camp (Doubleday)
The Mexican War 1846-47 (1974) by K. Jack Bauer, University of Nebraska Press
Shardik (1974), by Richard Adams [map]
Infamy: Pearl Harbor and its Aftermath (1982) by John Toland (Doubleday) [maps]
The Image of War: 1861-1865 (1981–84), edited by William C. Davis (Doubleday)
 "A Diary of Battle: The Personal Journals of Colonel Charles S. Wainwright, 1861-1865" (1998), edited by, Allan Nevins Da Capo Press

External links
Rivers of America series maps

20th-century cartographers
1905 births
1993 deaths
20th-century American artists